The Government Degree College Kupwara (Urdu;) is a Govt. run co-educational college located in the Kupwara district in the Indian union territory of Jammu and Kashmir. It is recognized by the University Grants Commission.

History 

The college was established in 1988 by Jammu and Kashmir's department of higher education with the aim of opening learning opportunities for the students of Kupwara. The college is affiliated with the University of Kashmir and is recognized by UGC under 2(F) and 12(B) of UGC Act, 1956.

The college started as a makeshift arrangement at Government Higher Secondary School Kupwara and quickly established a temporary campus on the river side of the school. In 2000, the college moved to its present campus, located about 1.5 km from Kupwara town in Bohipora.

Evaluation 

It has been awarded grade "A" by NAAC.

Location 

The college is located about 97  km from Srinagar. It is about 1.5 km from Kupwara town center in Bohipora on Kupwara-Gushi road.

Courses 
The college offers bachelor's degrees in various subjects like Arts, Science, Commerce and Computer Science; in addition, there are several add-on courses available.

Bachelors degrees 

 Bachelor of Arts (BA)
 Bachelor of Science (Medical)
 Bachelor of Science (Non Medical)
 Bachelor of Commerce (B.Com)
 Bachelor of Computer Applications (BCA)

Other courses 

 Computer Applications
 Data Care Management
 Lab Techniques
 Sericulture Management

Recognition 

The college was the first among valley colleges to get a NAAC RE Accreditation grade A in 2022 With CGPA 3.15.

References 

Degree colleges in Kashmir Division
Universities and colleges in Jammu and Kashmir
University of Kashmir
Educational institutions established in 1988
1988 establishments in Jammu and Kashmir